Faletoa Va'apu'u Vitale (born 4 December 1970 in Apia), also known as Va'a Vitale, is a Samoan rugby union player. He plays as a fly-half.

Career
At club level, Vitale played for the Samoan club Vaiala. 
His first international cap was during a match against Wales, at Moamoa, on 25 June 1994, being capped five times. 
He was also part of the 1995 Rugby World Cup roster, although never playing any match.
His last international cap was against Tonga, at Nuku'alofa, on 8 July 1995.

Coaching career
In 2005, he was a member of the coaching staff of the Samoa U21 national team at the World Cup, in 2011 he headed the U21 national team. In 2015, he was the coach of the Tangaroa secondary school team at the Auckland Blues rugby tens invitational tournament.

Personal life
Currently, he resides in Auckland, New Zealand.

References

External links
 

1970 births
Living people
Sportspeople from Apia
Samoan rugby union players
Samoan expatriates in New Zealand
Rugby union scrum-halves
Samoa international rugby union players